was a Japanese baseball player of the Hiroshima Toyo Carp of Japan's Central League.

He was one of the most famous Japanese right-handed pitchers. He was known as the  because from his pitching style with the fastball. His nickname was "Tsune-Gon"(ツネゴン).

He was born in Shūnan, Yamaguchi. He retired in 1991, and died of brain tumor in 1993, when he was 32 years old.

His memorial plate, found at Hiroshima Municipal Stadium, is inscribed with the words "We will never forget about his fastball, smile, courage and bravery".

He led his team in two Japan Series and won one title (1984).

Career
1st pitch: April 10, 1982.
1st win: April 29, 1982.
Rookie of the Year Award winner: 1982
Comeback Player of the Year Award winner: 1986
Best Pitcher of Japan Series Award winner: 1986
Relief Man of the Year Award winner: 1989
Japan All-star game: 1983, 1986, 1987, 1988 and 1989
49 W, 90 S, 19 CG, 2 Shutout and 542 K.

Statistics

Honours
The minor planet 79254 Tsuda was named in his memory on June 1, 2007.

Media

Books

 Just One More Pitch - The Fastball Life of Red-Hot Reliever Tsuda Tsunemi - NHK Books (1994)
 The Last Strike (two years and three months with Tsuda Tsunemi) - Keibunsha (1995)

Documentary and Drama

 Just One More Pitch: The Fastball Life of Red-Hot Reliever Tsuda Tsunemi - NHK (1994)
 The Last Strike - Fuji Television (2000)

References

External links
 NHK archives: NHK Special: Just One More Pitch: The Fastball Life of Red-Hot Reliever Tsuda Tsunemi (Japanese)
 Moving Tsuda memorial plate to the new stadium (Japanese)
  (Japanese)

1960 births
1993 deaths
Baseball people from Yamaguchi Prefecture
Japanese baseball players
Nippon Professional Baseball pitchers
Hiroshima Toyo Carp players
Nippon Professional Baseball Rookie of the Year Award winners
Deaths from brain cancer in Japan
Japanese Baseball Hall of Fame inductees